Danaluy-e Bozorg (also Romanized as Dānālūy-e Bozorg; also known as Dānālū and Dānālū-ye Bozorg) is a village in Qaleh Darrehsi Rural District, in the Central District of Maku County, West Azerbaijan Province, Iran. At the 2006 census, its population was 451, in 97 families.

References 

Populated places in Maku County